Center Township may refer to the following places in the U.S. state of Iowa:

 Center Township, Allamakee County, Iowa
 Center Township, Calhoun County, Iowa
 Center Township, Cedar County, Iowa
 Center Township, Clinton County, Iowa
 Center Township, Decatur County, Iowa
 Center Township, Dubuque County, Iowa
 Center Township, Emmet County, Iowa
 Center Township, Fayette County, Iowa
 Center Township, Henry County, Iowa
 Center Township, Jefferson County, Iowa
 Center Township, Mills County, Iowa
 Center Township, Monona County, Iowa
 Center Township, O'Brien County, Iowa
 Center Township, Pocahontas County, Iowa
 Center Township, Pottawattamie County, Iowa
 Center Township, Shelby County, Iowa
 Center Township, Sioux County, Iowa
 Center Township, Wapello County, Iowa
 Center Township, Winnebago County, Iowa

See also
Center Township (disambiguation)

Iowa township disambiguation pages